Dhaubadi is the village in Northern part of Nawalparasi District, Gandaki Province, Nepal. Known for huge iron reserves, it has attracted national & international attention.

References 

Populated places in Nawalpur District